Two ships of the Royal Australian Navy (RAN) have been named HMAS Success.

, an S-class destroyer launched in 1918, decommissioned in 1931, and sold for scrap
, a Durance-class replenishment oiler launched in 1984, decommissioned in 2019

Battle honours
Ships named HMAS Success are entitled to carry two battle honours:
Kuwait 1991
East Timor 1999

See also
 , sixteen ships of the Royal Navy

References

Royal Australian Navy ship names